2000trees festival is an independent music festival held from Wednesday to Sunday on the second week of July at Upcote Farm, Withington, near Cheltenham in Gloucestershire. It offers a diverse selection of more than 120 acts across five stages, plus comedy, a large selection of food traders, themed bars and a headphone disco on the two main stages every night of the festival. It also won the Grass Roots Festival Award at the UK Festival Awards 2010, 2013 and 2017 and the Best Medium-Sized UK Festival in 2018.

2000trees was started by six friends in 2007. The festival has performances across a number of stages which have evolved over the years, including: Main Stage, The Cave (second stage), The Axiom (formerly The Leaf Lounge), The Neu (formerly The Croft and The Greenhouse) plus a small acoustic stage in The Forest area.

Past acts

2007
 InMe
 Frank Turner
 Brian James
 Brigade
 The Voom Blooms
 Devil Sold His Soul
 Goldrush
 Piney Gir
 Hesters Way

2008

 Eighties Matchbox B-Line Disaster
 Art Brut
 Frank Turner
 The King Blues
 The Duke Spirit
 These New Puritans
 Future of the Left
 Slaves to Gravity
 The Ghost of a Thousand
 In Case of Fire
 Tubelord

2009
 British Sea Power
 Fightstar
 Red Light Company
 The King Blues
 Amplifier
 Dananananaykroyd
 Sucioperro
 Wild Beasts
 Rolo Tomassi
 Attack! Attack!
 The Chapman Family
 SixNationState
 Godsized

2010
 The Subways
 Frank Turner
 Twin Atlantic
 Bombay Bicycle Club
 65daysofstatic
 Metronomy
 Pulled Apart By Horses
 Future of the Left
 The Xcerts
 Three Trapped Tigers
 Johnny Flynn
 Errors
 Sonic Boom Six
 Vessels
 And So I Watch You From Afar
 Tubelord
 A Genuine Freakshow
 Left Side Brain

2011
 Frightened Rabbit
 Dan le Sac vs Scroobius Pip
 The King Blues
 Sucioperro
 Los Campesinos!
 Japanese Voyeurs
 Mojo Fury
 Twin Atlantic
 Tellison
 Devil Sold His Soul
 Amplifier
 Maybeshewill
 And So I Watch You From Afar
 Ellen and the Escapades
 The Twilight Sad
 Exit Ten
 Malefice
 Your Demise
 Islet

2012
 Dry the River
 Lucy Rose
 Guillemots
 Summer Camp
 65daysofstatic
 Gallows
 Pulled Apart By Horses
 Rolo Tomassi
 Tellison
 Turbowolf
 Dog Is Dead
 Sharks
 The Xcerts
 VerseChorusVerse
 Johnny Foreigner
 We Were Promised Jetpacks
 Max Raptor
 Spy Catcher
 Hundred Reasons

2013
 Frank Turner
 Mystery Jets
 Funeral for a Friend
 Stornoway
 Future of the Left
 Nine Black Alps
 InMe
 We Are the Ocean
 And So I Watch You From Afar
 King Charles
 Fighting With Wire
 Crowns
 Gnarwolves
 Fight Like Apes
GFM
 Maybeshewill

2014
 Band Of Skulls
 Dan Le Sac Vs Scroobius Pip
 Arcane Roots
 Kids in Glass Houses
Frightened Rabbit
 The Blackout
 The Bronx
 Blood Red Shoes
 Maybeshewill
 VerseChorusVerse
 Canterbury
 Johnny Foreigner
 Jamie Lenman
 Three Trapped Tigers
 Itch
 Heart in Hand
GFM
  Public Service Broadcasting
 Wolf Alice
Slaves
 CCTV Allstars

2015
 Alkaline Trio
 Deaf Havana
 Idlewild
 The Xcerts
 The Subways
 We Are The Ocean
 Pulled Apart By Horses
 Nothing But Thieves
 And So I Watch You From Afar
 The Skints
 Mclusky
 Future of the Left
 Defeater
 Turbowolf
 Kerbdog
 Young Guns
GFM
 Creeper
 Milk Teeth

2016
 Refused
 Twin Atlantic
 Mallory Knox
 Neck Deep
 While She Sleeps
 The Bronx
 Basement
 The King Blues
 Lonely the Brave
 Moose Blood
 We Were Promised Jetpacks
 Counterfeit
 Arcane Roots
GFM
 Martha Phillips
 The Xcerts
 Dinosaur Pile Up
 Creeper
 The Smith Street Band
 Max Raptor

2017 

Mallory Knox
Pulled Apart By Horses
Young Guns
Dinosaur Pile-Up
 Feed The Rhino
Roam (band)
 Muncie Girls
 blackfoxxes
 Tigercub
 Puppy
 Straight Lines
 Ducking Punches
 Grumble Bee
 Bellevue Days
 Jonah Matranga
 Adam Carpenter
 Kamikaze Girls
 Nothing But Thieves
 Frank Carter & The Rattlesnakes
 The Wonder Years
 Jamie Lenman
 Skinny Lister
 Will Varley
 Black Peaks (band)
 Queen Kwong
 Brutus
 Steven Battelle
 Vukovi
 De Staat
 Tall Ships
 Decade
 Wallflower
 wars
 Greywind
 Strange Bones
 Making Monsters
 Ducking Punches
 SHVPES
 Away Days
 Milestones
 Weirds
 Personal Best
 Cassells
 Louise Distras
 The St. Pierre Snake Invasion
 Polary
 Slaves
 Lower Than Atlantis
 The Front Bottoms
 The Menzingers
 Honey Blood
 Beach Slang
 Gnarwolves
 Kevin Devine
 Rolo Tomassi
 Area 11
 The One Hundred
 Sløtface
 The Hyena Kill
 Get Inuit
 Acres
 Peaness
 MOSES
 Petrol Girls
GFM
 Big Spring
 Kamikaze Girls
 Bad Sign
 Doe
 Fizzy Blood
 Giants
 Apologies, I Have None
 Soeur

2018 

And So I Watch You From Afar
Andy Merritt
Arcane Roots
Asylums
At the Drive-in
Avalanche Party
Bad Sign
Basement
Beans on Toast
Ben Marwood
Bitch Falcon
Black Foxxes
Black Futures
Black Honey
Black Peaks
Blood Command
Blood Red Shoes
Bloody Knees
Boston Manor
Brutus
Bryde
Caleb Harris
Chapter and Verse
Chloe Glover
Conjurer
Courage My Love
COVE
Crazy Arm
Creeper
Dave McPherson (INME)
Demob Happy
Dottie
Dream State
Dream Wife
Elijah Miller
Enter Shikari
Fangclub
Fatherson
Forever Cult
Frauds
Funeral Shakes
Gallops
Gender Roles
GFM
Gloo
Gold Key
GroundCulture
Grumble Bee
Haggard Cat
Hell is for Heroes
Hellions
Ho99o9
Holding Absence
Holiday Oscar
Hush Mozey
Imperial Leisure
InTechnicolour
Jack Louis Cooper
James Humphries
Jamie Lenman
Jonah Matranga
Jordan Grant
Karim
La Lune
Lady Bird
Louise Distras
Luke Marshall Black
Luke Rainsford
Luvia
Mallory Knox
Mantra
Marius Bear
Marmozets
Mauwe
Meat Wave
Moose Blood
Muskets
My Vitriol
Nelson Can
Nervus
No Violet 
Nova Twins
Pace
Palm Reader
PD Liddle
Phoxjaw
PINS
Press to Meco
Queen Kwong
Raging Speedhorn
Reigning Days
Saint Leonard's Horses
Sean McGowan
Shvpes
Sick Joy
SikTh
Skinny Lister
Sløtface
Soeur
Sun Arcana
Swedish Death Candy
The Dirty Nil
The Kenneths
The Xcerts
Thrill Collins
Touche Amore
Turbowolf
Turnstile
Twin Atlantic
Undead Raisins
Vodun
Vukovi
We Were Promised Jetpacks
Will Varley
Woes

2019 

Frank Turner and the Sleeping Souls
You Me At Six
While She Sleeps
Every Time I Die
Frank Iero and the Future Violents
Skinny Lister
Mongol Horde
Therapy?
Jamie Lenman
Rolo Tomassi
Estrons
Indoor Pets
Comeback Kid
DANGERFACE
Cavetown
Hands Like Houses
Milk Teeth
Grace Petrie
Martha
Puppy
Muncie Girls
Single Mothers
Møl
Higher Power
Gouge Away
Loathe
GFM
Nervus
Orchards
Life
Petrol Girls
St Pierre Snake Invasion
Wstr
Jim Lockey and the Solemn Sun
Crazy Arm
Sean McGowan
Imperial Leisure
Oxygen Thief
Johnny Lloyd
Brand New Friend
Deux Furieuses
Groundculture
The Drew Thompson Foundation
Heavy Lungs
Indigo Lo
Lice
Spielbergs
Sunshine Frisbee Laserbeam
Phoxjaw
Frauds
False Advertising

2020 
2000trees was cancelled due to COVID-19.

2021 
2000trees was cancelled for the second consecutive year due to complications relating to COVID-19, including international travel restrictions preventing acts from entering the United Kingdom, and the government not providing insurance to the live events industry in the event the festival would need to be cancelled.

See also
 
 List of indie rock festivals

References

External links

 Official 2000trees Festival website
 BBC article on small festivals, featuring 2000trees Festival

Music festivals in Gloucestershire
2007 establishments in England
Indie rock festivals
Music festivals established in 2007
Rock festivals in the United Kingdom